Vasyl Mykolayovych Henyk (born 15 July 1998) is a Ukrainian professional footballer who plays as a defensive midfielder for Ukrainian club Prykarpattia Ivano-Frankivsk.

References

External links
 Profile on Prykarpattia Ivano-Frankivsk official website
 
 

1998 births
Living people
Sportspeople from Ivano-Frankivsk
Ukrainian footballers
Association football midfielders
FC Chornohora Ivano-Frankivsk players
FC Prykarpattia Ivano-Frankivsk (1998) players
Ukrainian First League players
Ukrainian Second League players